The Ligas Distritales del Peru are the Peruvian football lower divisions. They are administered by the Local Federations. The level immediately above is the Liga Provincial (Copa Perú).

The following is a list of notable district football leagues in Peru sorted by region.

Amazonas

Liga Distrital de Chachapoyas

Ancash

Liga Distrital de Chimbote

Liga Distrital de Huaraz

Apurímac

Liga Distrital de Abancay

Liga Distrital de Andahuaylas

Arequipa

Liga Distrital de Arequipa

Liga Distrital de Camaná

Liga Distrital de Mollendo

Ayacucho

Liga Distrital de Ayacucho

Cajamarca

Liga Distrital de Cajamarca

Callao

Liga Distrital del Callao

Cusco

Liga Distrital del Cusco

Huancavelica

Liga Distrital de Huancavelica

Huánuco

Liga Distrital de Huánuco

Ica

Liga Distrital de Ica

Liga Distrital de Nasca

Liga Distrital de Pisco

Junín

Liga Distrital de Huancayo

Liga Distrital de Tarma

La Libertad

Liga Distrital de Chao

Liga Distrital de Huamachuco

Liga Distrital de Pacasmayo

Liga Distrital de Trujillo

Lambayeque

Liga Distrital de Chiclayo

Lima Metropolitana

Liga Distrital de Ancón

Liga Distrital de Ate Vitarte

Liga Distrital de Barranco

Liga Distrital de Breña

Liga Distrital de Canto Grande

Liga Distrital de Carabayllo

Liga Distrital de Cercado de Lima

Liga Distrital de Chaclacayo

Liga Distrital de Chorrillos

Liga Distrital de Chosica

Liga Distrital de Collique

Liga Distrital de Comas

Liga Distrital de El Agustino

Liga Distrital de Huaycán

Liga Distrital de Independencia

Liga Distrital de Jesús María

Liga Distrital de José Carlos Mariategui

Liga Distrital de La Molina

Liga Distrital de La Victoria

Liga Distrital de Lince

Liga Distrital de Los Olivos

Liga Distrital de Lurín

Liga Distrital de Magdalena del Mar

Liga Distrital de Miraflores

Liga Distrital de Pachacámac

Liga Distrital de Pueblo Libre

Liga Distrital de Puente Piedra

Liga Distrital de Punta Hermosa

Liga Distrital de Punta Negra

Liga Distrital de Rímac

Liga Distrital de San Bartolo

Liga Distrital de San Borja

Liga Distrital de San Isidro

Liga Distrital de San Juan de Lurigancho

Liga Distrital de San Juan de Miraflores

Liga Distrital de San Luis

Liga Distrital de San Martín de Porres

Liga Distrital de San Miguel

Liga Distrital de Santa Anita

Liga Distrital de Santiago de Surco

Liga Distrital de Surquillo

Liga Distrital de Villa El Salvador

Liga Distrital de Villa María del Triunfo

Lima Provincias

Liga Distrital de Barranca

Liga Distrital de Chancay

Liga Distrital de Cerro Azul

Liga Distrital de Huacho

Liga Distrital de Huaral

Liga Distrital de Imperial

Liga Distrital de Paramonga

Liga Distrital de San Vicente

Liga Distrital de Supe Pueblo

Loreto

Liga Distrital de Iquitos

Madre de Dios

Liga Distrital de Tambopata

Moquegua

Liga Distrital de Ilo

Liga Distrital de Moquegua

Pasco

Liga Distrital de Chaupimarca

Piura

Liga Distrital de Piura

Liga Distrital de Pariñas

Liga Distrital de Sechura

Liga Distrital de Sullana

Puno

Liga Distrital de Juliaca

Liga Distrital de Puno

San Martín

Liga Distrital de Tarapoto

Tacna

Liga Distrital de Tacna

Tumbes

Liga Distrital de Tumbes

Liga Distrital de Zarumilla

Ucayali

Liga Distrital de Callería

External links
Peruvian Football Federation
RSSSF

7